Death by Design is a 1943 British mystery film directed by Germain Burger and starring John Longden, Wally Patch and Barbara James.

Cast
 John Longden as Inspector Slade
 Wally Patch as Sergeant Clinton 
 Leonard Sharp as Bob Joyce
 Barbara James as Betty Marston
 George Ellisia as Phil Gorman

References

Bibliography
 Low, Rachael. Filmmaking in 1930s Britain. George Allen & Unwin, 1985.
 Wood, Linda. British Films, 1927-1939. British Film Institute, 1986.

External links

1943 films
British mystery films
British black-and-white films
Films set in England
1940s mystery films
1940s English-language films
1940s British films